The Iranian Red Crescent Society (IRCS), officially the Red Crescent Society of the Islamic Republic of Iran is a non-governmental humanitarian organization in Iran. Founded as the Red Lion and Sun Society in 1922, it became affiliated with the International Federation of Red Cross and Red Crescent Societies (IFRC) in 1924 and changed its name and emblem in 1980, informing the international community of Hilal Ahmar adoption while assuming the right to adopt the former emblem in future.

The society is one of the world's largest national societies within IFRC and is noted for its special expertise in responding to earthquakes.

Since inception, the IRCS has participated in a variety of public activities. Its core activity is to perform relief and rescue operations to help victims and the injured in natural disasters and accidents. It also engages a in wide range of humanitarian services in health and rehabilitation, training and research. The society had a therapeutic approach and was regarded a major healthcare institution with thousands of hospital beds across the country until 1979, when all of its medical facilities were transferred to the Ministry of Health.

IRCS is an example of strong national societies that play an important role domestically and is held in high esteem by the Iranian general public.

Organization

IRCS has 30 governorate headquarters, one in each province of Iran, and 330 branches throughout the country, as of 2005. Based on the latest structure, it is made up of four departments: relief and rescue (emdād wa najāt), medical provisions (tadārokāt-e pezeški), volunteers (dāvṭalabān), and youth (javānān). The latter is largely made up of high school and university student members.

According to the law enacted by the Iranian Parliament, the society is run by a chairman appointed by the President of Iran. This procedure is in contrast with the elective nature of a society chairman as suggested by the IFRC. The secretary general is responsible for the administrative and executive affairs.

Other subordinates 
IRCS owns and runs Helal Iran Textile Industries Co., a producer of blankets and tents. SOHA, a manufacturer of disposable medical devices is also owned by the society, as well as Shahrvand, a daily newspaper. The Iranian Red Crescent Medical Journal, an English language peer-reviewed journal on clinical and scientific medicine, is another publication of IRCS.

Presidents 
Heads of the society have been:
 1922–1949: Amir Amir-A'lam (deputy director)
 1922–1925: Mohammad Hassan Mirza (honorary)
 1927–1931: Mostowfi ol-Mamalek (chairman)
 1931–1941: Reza Pahlavi (symbolic)
 1941–1949: Mohammad Reza Pahlavi
 1949–1979: Hossein Khatibi Nouri (managing director)
 1949–1979: Shams Pahlavi (chairwoman)
 1979–1980: Kazem Sami
 1980–1981: Ali Behzadnia
 1981–1983: Hassan Firouzabadi
 1983–1999: Seifollah Vahid Dastjerdi
 1999–2006: Ahmad-Ali Nourbala
 2006–2010: Masoud Khatami
 2010–2013: Abolhassan Faqih
 2013–2014: Mohammad Farhadi
 2014–2017: Amir-Mohsen Ziayi
 2017–2019: Ali Asqar Peyvandi
 2020–2021: Karim Hemmati
 2021–present: Pir-Hossein Kolivand

References

External links

Official Website
Iranian Red Crescent Medical Journal

Iran
1922 establishments in Iran
Organizations established in 1922
Medical and health organisations based in Iran
Emergency management in Iran
First aid organizations
Volunteer organizations
Non-profit organisations based in Iran